NGC 504, also occasionally referred to as PGC 5084 or UGC 935, is a lenticular galaxy located approximately 189 million light-years from the Solar System in the constellation Pisces. It was discovered on 22 November 1827 by astronomer John Herschel. The object was listed twice in the General Catalogue, precursor of the New General Catalogue, as both GC 291 and GC 292.

Observation history 
Herschel discovered the object without recording a visual description. However, he noted the nebula "precedes NGC 507 by about 10 seconds and is half a field to the south of it". NGC 504 was later also independently discovered by Heinrich d'Arrest, using an 11" reflecting telescope in Copenhagen and assuming the object was new. This led to Herschel cataloguing the two observations separately as GC 291 and GC 292. The objects were later combined by John Louis Emil Dreyer with the creation of the New General Catalogue, in which the galaxy was described as "very faint, small".

See also 
 Lenticular galaxy 
 List of NGC objects (1–1000)
 Pisces (constellation)

References

External links 

 
 SEDS

Lenticular galaxies
Pisces (constellation)
0504
5084
00935
Astronomical objects discovered in 1827
Discoveries by John Herschel